The Jordanaires were an American vocal quartet that formed as a gospel group in 1948. Over the years, they recorded both sacred and secular music for recording companies such as Capitol Records, RCA Victor, Columbia Records, Decca Records, Vocalion Records, Stop Records, and many other smaller independent labels.  

In the mid-1950s, they also began lending their vocal talents to other artists as background singers in recording sessions.  They are widely known for having provided background vocals for Elvis Presley, in live appearances, recordings, and feature films from 1956 to 1972. The group worked in the recording studio, on stage, and on television with many country, gospel, and rock and roll artists. 

They also provided background vocals using the name the Merry Melody Singers and the Almanac Singers, sometimes using different personnel.

Group history

Early years

In 1948, Monty and Bill Matthews left. Hawkins switched to baritone, and new lead Neal Matthews was recruited. Don Bruce came in as a new first tenor, but he was drafted the next year. The group narrowed to a quartet, with Gordon Stoker taking over as first tenor. They became members of the Grand Ole Opry in 1949. They recorded for Capitol Records in the early 1950s, and began providing vocal accompaniment behind solo singers in Nashville, Tennessee.

The quartet became well known in the Southern gospel genre, and what made them stand out from other quartets of that time was how they would bring spirituals (such as "Dry Bones") to a predominantly white audience. While continuing to turn out gospel albums of their own, the group became better known for the signature background harmonies they have provided on dozens of secular records.

Patsy Cline
The group appeared on all of Patsy Cline's Decca sessions from her first in November 1960 to her last in February 1963, during which time they backed her on songs such as:

"A Poor Man's Roses (Or a Rich Man's Gold)"
"Always"
"Blue Moon of Kentucky"
"Crazy" 
"Crazy Arms"
"Faded Love"
"Foolin' Around"
"Half as Much"
"Have You Ever Been Lonely (Have You Ever Been Blue)?"
"Heartaches"
"I Can't Help It (If I'm Still in Love with You)"
"I Fall to Pieces" 
"Leavin' on Your Mind"
"Love Letters in the Sand"
"San Antonio Rose"
"Seven Lonely Days"
"She's Got You"
"Someday (You'll Want Me to Want You)"
"South of the Border (Down Mexico Way)"
"Sweet Dreams"
"That's My Desire"
"The Wayward Wind"
"True Love"
"Walkin' After Midnight" (1961 recording)
"You Belong to Me"
"You Made Me Love You (I Didn't Want to Do It)"
"Your Cheatin' Heart"

After Elvis and Cline

The group changed again in 1982, when Hoyt Hawkins died. His replacement was Duane West, formerly of Sonny James' backup group, the Southern Gentlemen. In 1990, the group provided backing vocals for Presley's former Sun Records labelmate Johnny Cash on his Mercury Records album Boom Chicka Boom. The group has also recorded with the Swedish group Vikingarna.

Deaths

Hugh Jarrett died at 78 on May 31, 2008, from injuries sustained in an auto accident in March. 

Gordon Stoker died at 88 at his Brentwood, Tennessee, home on March 27, 2013, after a long illness. His son Alan confirmed that The Jordanaires were formally dissolved, per his father's wishes.

Members

Classic lineup
 Hoyt Hawkins – baritone and lead vocals, piano, organ, percussion (1949-1980; died 1980)
 Neal Matthews Jr. — second tenor and lead vocals, rhythm guitar, lead guitar, double bass, bass guitar (1949–2000; died 2000)
 Gordon Stoker – tenor vocals, piano, organ, percussion (1951-2013; died 2013)
 Ray Walker – bass vocals (1958-2013)

Other members
 Bill Matthews – vocals (1948-1949)
 Monty Matthews – vocals (1948-1949)
 Bob Hubbard – vocals (1948-1949)
 Culley Holt – bass vocals (1949-1954)
 Bob Money – piano (1949-1951)
 Don Bruce – first tenor vocals (1949-1950)
 Hugh Jarrett – bass vocals (1954-1958)
 Duane West – baritone vocals (1980-1999; died 2002)
 Louis Nunley – baritone vocals (1999-2013)
 Curtis Young – lead vocals (2000-2013)

Session appearances
The Jordanaires performed with many modern recording artists, as well as recent sessions with country musicians.
1957: Ricky Nelson's "Poor Little Fool", "Lonesome Town", "It's Late", "I Believe What You Say" and other hit recordings
1959: Several tracks on Johnny Cash's albums The Fabulous Johnny Cash and Songs of our Soil, the 1978 album I Would Like to See You Again and others
1964: Cliff Richard's 1965 singles "The Minute You're Gone", "Wind Me Up (Let Me Go)", "On My Word" and a few other album and EP tracks
1970: Ringo Starr's second solo album, Beaucoups of Blues
1973: Bobby Bare's hit single "Ride Me Down Easy"
1975: Jack Jersey two albums I Wonder (a live album) and Honky Tonk Man
1975: Gary Stewart's RCA debut Out of Hand, that spawned three top ten hits including the "She's Acting Single"
1980: Don McLean's album Chain Lightning
1981: Don McLean's album Believers
1981: On several tracks for Gene Summers' LP Gene Summers in Nashville
1984: Dolly Parton's song "Save The Last Dance For Me" on the album The Great Pretender
1985: Four songs by The Blasters' from their album Hard Line including "Samson and Delilah" 
1988: Appeared in Sawyer Brown's music video "My Baby's Gone"
1993: "Bigger Than Elvis" on Chicago's album titled Chicago XXXII: Stone of Sisyphus, recorded in 1993 and published in 2008
 1996: Ween's album 12 Golden Country Greats
1997: On "Who'll Be The One If Not Me" for the off-Broadway musical Violet
1998: On "You Better Move On" and "Tomorrow Night" on Sugar Ray Norcia's album Sweet & Swingin' 
1999: began their collaborative work with Art Greenhaw, which resulted in a Grammy Award for Best Southern, Country or Bluegrass Gospel Album for We Called Him Mr. Gospel Music: The James Blackwood Tribute Album (2003), and six Grammy nominations for Best Album of the Year in a gospel category for other album titles, including The Great Gospel Hit Parade (2001), God Is Love (2002), Always Hear The Harmony (2004), 20th Century Gospel (2005) and Southern Meets Soul (2006) AllMusic noted about the 20th Century Gospel album that "Greenhaw's manly baritone is warm and inviting, and when backed by vocal-group legends the Jordanaires ("Gospel Woman," "Welcome to My World"), the resultant sound suggests the glory days of Elvis Presley and Jim Reeves."
2002: Sang with The Tractors' Steve Ripley
2006: The Grascals album Long List of Heartaches, on the song "Did You Forget God Today?"
2006–07: Friends of Henry Golis Wish You A Merry Christmas with the Jordanaires, and Henry Golis Presents Good Music With Friends featuring the Jordanaires
2007: appeared with the Christian pop band C.B.O.P. on the songs "Between You & Me" and "Live Like A King" on the album A Road Less Traveled
2007: "Save Your Dreams" by Americana artist Shark
2009: Today, Tomorrow & Forever EP by Pete Molinari
2010: Last Night In Nashville album by The Kingmakers
2011: Kristin Chenoweth's Some Lessons Learned, on "What Would Dolly Do"

See also
 The Nashville A-Team

References

External links
 
 "The Jordanaires" Vocal Group Hall of Fame Page
 Country Music Hall of Fame and Museum
 Spencer Leigh, "Gordon Stoker: Singer with the Jordanaires", The Independent, April 2, 2013
 Bob Hubbard Interview
 The Jordanaires recordings at the Discography of American Historical Recordings.
 

American gospel musical groups
Country Music Hall of Fame inductees
Gospel quartets
Grammy Award winners
Grand Ole Opry members
Musical backing groups
Musical groups established in 1948
Musical groups disestablished in 2013
RCA Victor artists
Southern gospel performers
Vocal quartets
X Records artists
2013 disestablishments in Missouri
1948 establishments in the United States
Elvis Presley